Mont-Élie is an unorganized territory in the Capitale-Nationale region of Quebec, Canada. It makes up almost 38% of the Charlevoix-Est Regional County Municipality.

The territory is home to the Grands-Ormes Ecological Reserve and part of the Hautes-Gorges-de-la-Rivière-Malbaie National Park. It is named after Mount Élie that in turn was named after Elijah. Nearby are other mountains and lakes named after Biblical prophets, such as Moses and Jeremiah. Mount Élie is one of the main summits of the mountainous highland in the east of the Charlevoix region. Its western slope forms the eastern boundary of the Hautes-Gorges-de-la-Rivière-Malbaie National Park, whereas its eastern side is part of ZEC Lac-au-Sable.

Demographics

Population

Private dwellings occupied by usual residents: 27 (total dwellings: 85)

See also
List of unorganized territories in Quebec

References

Unorganized territories in Capitale-Nationale